Sequence is the first  single album by South Korean girl group WJSN. It was released on July 5, 2022, by Starship Entertainment and distributed by Kakao Entertainment, almost 16 months after the group's latest release Unnatural. Marketed as a special single-album, the single album consists of 4 tracks, including "Last Sequence", serving as its lead single.

Background and release 

From March to June 2022, WJSN participated in the Mnet's reality-competition program Queendom 2, and finished as the winner. After the show, on June 3, Starship Entertainment announced that WJSN will be release the new music after a year and four months in July through a "coming soon" poster, uploaded on the group's social media platforms. The poster, which simulated the look of the ocean floor, also noted that the group is set to release new music on July 5 at 6:00 PM KST. Several concept photos, the tracklist, album previews and a music video teaser were released during the run-up to the release. Pre-sales for the physical album began on June 9. The album is available in CD, digital download and streaming formats. The physical album was released in 3 versions: Scene, Take One and Take Two. The album also came in jewel cases as well and there will be ten versions covering all ten members of the group.

Composition 
The title track "Last Sequence" is a pop-style dance song with a "wild bassline, drums and synths that makes the melody stand out even more" as it inherits the "splendid concept of WJSN". It contains lyrics that depict another beginning rather than the end. The song is composed in the key of G minor with 121 beats per minute and a running time of 3 minutes and 7 seconds.

The follow-up "Done" is a song with a deep house-base, and a "soft but gorgeous synthesizer sound on top". The third and the Queendom 2 winning song "Aura" is also re-recorded with the inclusion of Dawon who was on hiatus during the finale and it is the only track of the album that will be available for physical copies only. The album ends with "Stronger", a Pop-R&B track which was recorded by Dawon and Yeon-jung.

Track listing

Charts

Weekly charts

Monthly charts

Release history

Notes

References 

Single albums
2022 EPs
Cosmic Girls EPs
Korean-language EPs
Starship Entertainment albums